Highwire Act: Live in St. Louis 2003 is the fifth live album by the American rock band Little Feat, released in 2004 (see 2004 in music).  There was also a video of the same performance released on DVD.

Track listing
Disc 1
"Time Loves a Hero" (Paul Barrère, Kenny Gradney, Bill Payne) – 5:58
"Day or Night" (Payne, Fran Tate) – 9:47
"Cadillac Hotel" (Payne, Bill Wray) – 6:46
"Spanish Moon" (Lowell George) – 8:25
"Skin It Back" (Barrère) – 6:40
"Cajun Girl" (Kibbee, Payne) – 6:42
"Night on the Town" (Barrère, Fred Tackett) – 5:59
"I'd Be Lyin'" (Creamer, Mariani, Shaun Murphy) – 5:35
"The Blues Don't Tell It All" (Murphy, Payne) – 6:20

Disc 2
"Old Folks Boogie" (Barrère, Barrère) – 7:18
"Oh Atlanta" (Payne) – 4:52
"Dixie Chicken" (George, Martin Kibbee) – 17:44
"Tripe Face Boogie" (Richie Hayward, Payne) – 7:18
"Fat Man in the Bathtub" (George) – 11:44
"Let It Roll" (Barrère, Kibbee, Payne) – 9:29
"Willin'" (George) – 8:06
"Feats Don't Fail Me Now" (Barrère, George, Kibbee) – 5:23

References

Albums produced by Bill Payne
Little Feat live albums
2004 live albums